The Maritime Court of Ontario was an admiralty court in Ontario. It was created in 1877 by a federal statute. The Exchequer Court of Canada succeeded the Maritime Court by a statute passed in 1891. The Exchequer Court continued in 1971 as the Federal Court of Canada.

History 
Beginning in the 1860s, Canadian commentators began to see the need for an admiralty court with jurisdiction over commerce on the Great Lakes. Vice-admiralty courts had existed for many years in the Maritimes and Quebec. The Vice-Admiralty Court of Quebec was established in 1764. When Quebec was divided into Upper and Lower Canada, the court's jurisdiction was limited to Lower Canada. Early legislative proposals would have conferred admiralty jurisdiction on the Supreme Court of Canada but the court, created by statute in 1875, was not given such jurisdiction.

In 1877, the parliament of Canada established the Maritime Court of Ontario by the Maritime Jurisdiction Act, 1877. The statute came into force on July 7, 1877.

In 1891, the Exchequer Court of Canada became Canada's admiralty court pursuant to the Admiralty Act, 1891, SC 1891 (54–55 Vict), c 29. The Maritime Court of Ontario was accordingly abolished; its territory became known as the "Toronto Admiralty District" of the new court. The Exchequer Court was continued and reorganized in 1971 as the Federal Court of Canada.

American counterparts 
The constitution of the United States vests judicial power over all admiralty and maritime cases in federal courts. Beginning in 1845, United States district courts had exercised maritime jurisdiction by proceedings in rem, both when a right to process in rem was given by general admiralty law, as interpreted by American courts; and when the right arose under state legislation.

Jurisdiction 
The Maritime Court of Ontario had all jurisdiction exercised by then-existing British vice-admiralty courts in similar matters. It could hear both contract and tort claims. Its jurisdiction extended to proceedings in rem and in personam related to navigation, shipping, trade, or commerce on any river, lake, canal, or inland water located in whole or in part in Ontario.

Practice and procedure 
When the Maritime Court of Ontario was established, common law and equity had not yet been fused in Ontario. The rules of practice in the Maritime Court were modelled on the general orders of the Court of Chancery of Upper Canada.

The judges of the Maritime Court were the county judges of the county of York sitting in Toronto.

Appeals lay directly from the Maritime Court of Ontario to the Supreme Court of Canada.

Notes

Sources 
 
  
  
 

1877 establishments in Canada
1891 disestablishments in Canada
Admiralty courts
Ontario courts